Lawrence Smith Memorial Airport  is a city-owned, public-use airport located three nautical miles (6 km) south of the central business district of Harrisonville, a city in Cass County, Missouri, United States. It is included in the National Plan of Integrated Airport Systems for 2011–2015, which categorized it as a general aviation facility.

Although most U.S. airports use the same three-letter location identifier for the FAA and IATA, this airport is assigned LRY by the FAA but has no designation from the IATA.

Facilities and aircraft 
Lawrence Smith Memorial Airport covers an area of 126 acres (51 ha) at an elevation of 915 feet (279 m) above mean sea level. It has one runway designated 17/35 with an asphalt surface measuring 4,000 by 75 feet (1,219 x 23 m).

For the 12-month period ending December 31, 2011, the airport had 7,055 aircraft operations an average of 19 per day: 99% general aviation, <1% military, and <1% air taxi. At that time there were 31 aircraft based at this airport: 81% single-engine, 10% ultralight, 6% multi-engine, and 3% helicopter.

References

External links 
 Airport page at City of Harrisonville website
 Lawrence Smith Memorial (LRY) at Missouri DOT Airport Directory
 Aerial image as of March 1997 from USGS The National Map
 
 

Airports in Missouri
Cass County, Missouri